Henry Irving Louttit Sr. (January 1, 1903 – July 24, 1984) was bishop of South Florida and Central Florida  in The Episcopal Church. His son, Henry I. Louttit, Jr., was also a bishop.

Early life and education
Louttit was born on January 1, 1903, in Buffalo, New York, the son of William Henry Louttit and Susan Bruman. He was educated at Hobart College in Geneva, New York, where he graduated with a Bachelor of Artsdegree in 1925. He then entered Virginia Theological Seminary and graduated with a Bachelor of Divinity in 1929. He married Amy Cleckler on June 22, 1936, and together they had two sons. He was awarded a Doctor of Divinity from both the Virginia Seminary and Hobart.

Ordained ministry
Louttit was ordained deacon on July 15, 1928 and priest on June 23, 1929. He became rector of All Saints' Church in Tarpon Springs, Florida. He then moved to his home parish, Trinity Church in Miami to serve as a curate. From 1930 to 1933, he was rector of Holy Cross Church in Sanford, Florida. In 1933 he became the rector of Holy Trinity Church in West Palm Beach, Florida. During World War II, he enrolled as a chaplain in the US Army with the 31st Infantry Division in the Dutch East Indies.

Episcopacy
On February 7, 1945, Louttit was elected on the second ballot as Suffragan Bishop of South Florida during a special diocesan meeting that took place in St Luke's Cathedral, Orlando, Florida. He was then consecrated on May 23, 1945 by the Bishop of South Florida John Durham Wing in Holy Trinity Church. On April 14, 1948, he was elected Coadjutor Bishop of South Florida and succeeded as diocesan on January 1, 1951. During his episcopate, the large Diocese of South Florida was divided in three in 1969. With his retirement on December 31, 1969, the Diocese of South Florida ceased to exist and he became the first Bishop of Central Florida. He served in that post till 1970, when a new bishop was elected.

Louttit was also one of twelve bishops who formed a "Committee of Bishops to Defend the Faith" and charged the Bishop of California, James Pike, with several heresies.

References

1903 births
1984 deaths
Religious leaders from Buffalo, New York
Hobart and William Smith Colleges alumni
Virginia Theological Seminary alumni
20th-century American Episcopalians
Episcopal bishops of Central Florida
Episcopal bishops of South Florida
20th-century American clergy